Cyrtorhyncha is a genus of flowering plants belonging to the family Ranunculaceae.

Its native range is Northern America.

Species:
 Cyrtorhyncha ranunculina Nutt.

References

Ranunculaceae
Ranunculaceae genera